Indranee Thurai Rajah  (born 1963) is a Singaporean politician who has been serving as Minister in the Prime Minister's Office and Second Minister for Finance since 2018, Second Minister for National Development and Leader of the House since 2020. A member of the governing People's Action Party (PAP), she has been the Member of Parliament (MP) representing the Tanjong Pagar–Tiong Bahru division of Tanjong Pagar GRC since 2015.

Prior to entering politics, Indranee was a lawyer at Freshfields Bruckhaus Deringer and Drew & Napier. She was appointed Senior Counsel in January 2003. 

Indranee made her political debut in the 2001 general election as part of a six-member PAP team contesting in Tanjong Pagar GRC and won. She was subsequently elected as the Member of Parliament (MP) representing the Tanglin–Cairnhill ward of Tanjong Pagar GRC.

After the death of Minister Mentor Lee Kuan Yew on 23 March 2015, Indranee served as the MP for the Tanjong Pagar–Tiong Bahru ward concurrently until the 2015 general election as no by-elections were called due to it being a group representation constituency (GRC). Since then, Indranee has been representing the Tanjong Pagar–Tiong Bahru ward of Tanjong Pagar GRC.

Education 
Indranee attended Marymount Convent Primary School, Marymount Convent Secondary School and Raffles Institution before graduating from the National University of Singapore with a Bachelor of Laws with honours degree in 1986.

Law career 
Indranee began her legal career in 1987 with Freshfields Bruckhaus Deringer. She joined Drew & Napier in 1988 and became a director of the firm in 1991. She was a litigator and had an active court practice as an advocate and solicitor, specialising in cross-border dispute resolution. She was appointed Senior Counsel by Chief Justice Yong Pung How in January 2003.

Political career
Indranee served as Deputy Speaker of Parliament between 2006 and 2011.

On 31 July 2012, Indranee was designated as Senior Minister of State for Law and Senior Minister of State for Education before being appointed on 1 November 2012.

Indranee led a 12-member committee in 2013 to provide a strategic direction for the planned third law school in Singapore, including its admissions criteria, curriculum development and educational philosophy. On 16 February 2016, the committee which includes the Ministry of Law and Singapore University of Social Sciences, held a joint press conference to announce the opening of the SUSS School of Law.

Indranee relinquished her position as Senior Minister of State for Education, before being appointed as Senior Minister of State for Finance on 1 October 2015.

On 9 March 2018, Indranee criticised Workers' Party Member of Parliament Sylvia Lim on Facebook after the latter voiced her suspicion on the government's intention to raise the GST in order to extract an apology. The public criticised Indranee and other PAP members for hounding Lim and being narrow-minded, and supported Lim for asking a legitimate question on behalf of her constituents.

On 1 May 2018, Indranee was appointed as Minister in the Prime Minister’s Office, Second Minister for Finance and Second Minister for Education. She was succeeded by Edwin Tong as Second Minister for Law on 30 June 2018.

On 20 August 2020, Indranee was appointed as Leader of the House for the 14th Parliament.

Personal life 
Indranee is the daughter of A. T. Rajah, a former Deputy Commissioner of Police and former President of the Singapore National Olympic Council. Her father was Hindu and her mother, an ethnic Chinese, was Anglican, and she was raised in her mother's faith.

References

External links

 Indranee Rajah on Prime Minister's Office
 Indranee Rajah on Parliament of Singapore

1963 births
Living people
Members of the Parliament of Singapore
National University of Singapore alumni
People's Action Party politicians
Singaporean women lawyers
Singaporean Anglicans
Singaporean people of Chinese descent
Singaporean people of Cantonese descent
Singaporean people of Indian descent
Singaporean people of Tamil descent
Singaporean Senior Counsel
Singaporean women in politics
Singaporean Tamil politicians
Women government ministers of Singapore
Members of the Cabinet of Singapore
Women legislative deputy speakers
20th-century Singaporean lawyers